Drosophila tristis  is a relatively uncommon European species of fruit flies from the family Drosophilidae. It is associated with deciduous woodland. Adults have been observed feeding on tree sap runs. Adults are in flight from April to November, being most abundant in June to August.

References 

tristis
Muscomorph flies of Europe
Taxa named by Carl Fredrik Fallén
Insects described in 1823